Safwan Sport Club, is an Iraqi football team based in Safwan, Basra, that plays in Iraq Division Two.

Managerial history
  Ahmed Azaitar
  Sami Kharnoob

See also 
 2021–22 Iraq Division Two

References

External links
 Iraq Clubs- Foundation Dates
 Basra Clubs Union

Football clubs in Iraq
1993 establishments in Iraq
Association football clubs established in 1993
Football clubs in Basra
Basra